Pulsarella komakimonos is a species of sea snail, a marine gastropod mollusk in the family Borsoniidae.

Description
This species has a superficial resemblance to Tomopleura oscitans Kilburn, 1986

Distribution
This marine species occurs off Japan

References

 Otuka, Yanosuke (1935)  "The Oti Graben in Southern Noto Peninsula, Japan.(Part 3)." Bulletin of the Earthquake Research Institute, Tokyo Imperial University, vol. 13, pt. 4, pp. 846–909, pls. 53–57

External links
 

komakimonos
Gastropods described in 1935